The name Sulpice may refer to 

 Sulpicius Severus, the 4th-century biographer
 Saint Sulpitius the Pious, a 7th-century saint
 Saint-Sulpice, many different locations in France

Surname:
 Jean Albert Sulpice (born 1913- ?), French curler